Funda is a Turkish feminine given name meaning "Heather", which may refer to:

People
 Funda Arar (born 1975), Turkish singer
 Funda Bilgi (born 1983), Turkish volleyball player
 Funda İyce Tuncel (born 1968), Turkish painter
 Funda Önal (born 1984), English model of Turkish descent
 Funda Teoman (born 1984), Turkish pro basketball referee

Places
 Funda, Cacuaco, Angola

Turkish feminine given names